Gongbo (died 845 BC) was the third ruler of the ancient Chinese state of Qin, founded when his grandfather Feizi was granted a small fief at Qin by King Xiao of Zhou.  Gongbo succeeded his father, the Marquis of Qin, who died in 848 BC, and ruled for three years.  He died in 845 BC and was succeeded by his son Qin Zhong.

Gongbo's ancestral name was Ying, but his given name is unknown.  Although Qin would eventually develop into a major power that would conquer all other Chinese states and unite China to form the Qin Dynasty in 221 BC, at the time of Gongbo it was still a minor state of the Western Zhou Dynasty and little is known about Gongbo.

Family 
Queen Meng Ji of the Ji clan  (孟姬  姬氏)
Qin Zhong, became the fourth rule of Qin

References

Rulers of Qin
9th-century BC Chinese monarchs
845 BC deaths
Year of birth unknown